La Rive is a former restaurant that was located in the InterContinental Amstel Amsterdam, Netherlands. It was a fine dining restaurant that was awarded one or more Michelin stars from 1993 to 2016. GaultMillau awarded the restaurant 18.0 points (out of 20 possible). The restaurant closed in 2020.

Last head chef was Roger Rassin (2008-2020). Former head chefs were, amongst others, Robert Kranenborg (1992-2000) and Edwin Katz (2000-2008)

The restaurant was a member of Alliance Gastronomique Néerlandaise, a Dutch/Belgian culinary association of quality restaurants.

Star history
 1993-1996: one star
 1997-2000: two stars
 2001: one star
 2002-2005: two stars
 2006-2016: one star

See also
List of Michelin starred restaurants in the Netherlands

Sources and references 

Restaurants in Amsterdam
Michelin Guide starred restaurants in the Netherlands